The Crack-Up (1945) is a collection of essays by American author F. Scott Fitzgerald. It includes previously unpublished letters and notes, along with the three essays Fitzgerald originally wrote for Esquire magazine, which were first published in 1936. After Fitzgerald's death in 1940, Edmund Wilson compiled and edited this anthology, first published by New Directions in 1945.

The main essay starts "Of course all life is a process of breaking down ...." which gives something of the tone of the piece.

Essays
"The Crack-Up" (originally Esquire magazine, February 1936)
"Pasting It Together" (originally Esquire magazine, March 1936)
"Handle with Care" (originally Esquire magazine, April 1936)
collected together under the title The Crack-Up in the book

The book also includes other essays by Fitzgerald and positive evaluations of his work by Glenway Wescott, John Dos Passos, and John Peale Bishop, plus letters from Gertrude Stein, T. S. Eliot, and Edith Wharton in 1925 praising Fitzgerald's novel The Great Gatsby.

Famous quotes
At the beginning of The Crack-Up Fitzgerald makes this widely quoted general observation:—

As an example of this "truth," he cites the ability to see that things are hopeless and yet be determined to make them otherwise. In modern decision theory, the quote has been used by some to explain the bias shown in many experiments, where subjects gather information to justify a preconceived notion. These experiments suggest that the mental ability described by Fitzgerald (being able to see both sides of an argument) is rarer than many assume.

Reaction
The essays when originally written were poorly received and many reviewers were openly critical, particularly of the personal revelations. Time has been somewhat kinder to them and the collection is an insight into the mind of the writer during this low period in his life.

The philosopher Gilles Deleuze adopted the term crack-up from Fitzgerald to refer to his interpretation of the Freudian death instinct.

In popular culture
The title of the 2017 Fleet Foxes album Crack-Up was inspired by these essays.

References

External links
The Crack-Up By F. Scott Fitzgerald, Esquire. Originally published in Esquires February, March, and April 1936 issues.

1945 books
Books by F. Scott Fitzgerald
Essay collections
Works originally published in Esquire (magazine)
Literature about alcohol abuse
Books published posthumously
New Directions Publishing books